Brian Concannon (born 1997) is an Irish hurler who plays as a right corner-forward for club side Killimordaly and at inter-county level with the Galway senior hurling team. He usually lines out as a right corner-forward.

Playing career

NUI Galway

As a student at NUI Galway, Concannon has been a regular player on the university's senior hurling team in the Fitzgibbon Cup.

Killimordaly

Concannon joined the Killimordaly club at a young age and played in all grades at juvenile and underage levels before joining the club's senior team.

Galway

Minor and under-21

Concannon first played for Galway as a member of the minor hurling team on 26 July 2015. He made his first appearance in a 1-14 to 0-13 All-Ireland quarter-final defeat of Limerick. On 6 September 2015, Concannon scored a goal from right wing-forward in Galway's 4-13 to 1-16 defeat of Tipperary in the All-Ireland final at Croke Park.

On 20 August 2016, Concannon made his first appearance for the Galway under-21 team in a 0-21 to 0-19 All-Ireland semi-final defeat of Dublin. In the subsequent All-Ireland final on 10 September 2016, he was an unused substitute in the 5-15 to 0-14 defeat by Waterford.

Concannon won a Leinster Championship medal on 4 July 2018 after a 4-21 to 2-26 extra-time defeat of Wexford in the final. In Concannon's last game in the grade on 8 August 2018, he was red-carded in the 33rd minute for an off-the-ball strike.

Senior

Concannon was one of eight new players drafted onto the Galway senior hurling panel prior to the start of the 2018 National League. He made his senior debut, scoring 1-01 from play at right corner-forward, in a 1-19 to 1-16 National Hurling League defeat of Antrim on 28 January 2018. Later that season Concannon made his first appearance in the Leinster Championship, scoring 2-01 from play, in a 5-18 to 2-15 defeat of Offaly. On 8 July 2018, he was an unused substitute in Galway's 1-28 to 3-15 Leinster final replay defeat of Kilkenny at Semple Stadium. Concannon subsequently missed the All-Ireland final defeat by Limerick after having the red card he picked up in an under-21 game upheld after an appeal.

Career statistics

Honours

Galway
Leinster Senior Hurling Championship (1): 2018
National Hurling League (1): 2021
Leinster Under-21 Hurling Championship (1): 2018
All-Ireland Minor Hurling Championship (1): 2015

References

1997 births
Living people
Killimordaly hurlers
Galway inter-county hurlers